Tricliceras is a genus of flowering plants belonging to the family Passifloraceae. Its native range is Tropical Africa, Southern Africa, Madagascar.

Species 

 Tricliceras auriculatum (A.Fern. & R.Fern.) R.Fern. 
 Tricliceras bivinianum (Tul.) R.Fern.
 Tricliceras brevicaule (Urb.) R.Fern. 
 Tricliceras elatum (A.Fern. & R.Fern.) R.Fern. 
 Tricliceras glanduliferum (Klotzsch) R.Fern. 
 Tricliceras hirsutum (A.Fern. & R.Fern.) R.Fern. 
 Tricliceras lanceolatum (A.Fern. & R.Fern.) R.Fern. 
 Tricliceras lobatum (Urb.) R.Fern. 
 Tricliceras longepedunculatum (Mast.) R.Fern. 
 Tricliceras mossambicense (A.Fern. & R.Fern.) R.Fern 
 Tricliceras pilosum (Willd.) R.Fern. 
 Tricliceras prittwitzii (Urb.) R.Fern. 
 Tricliceras schinzii (Urb.) R.Fern. 
 Tricliceras tanacetifolium (Klotzsch) R.Fern. 
 Tricliceras xylorhizum Verdc.

References

Passifloraceae
Malpighiales genera